Ugo Pistolesi (29 December 1883 – 17 January 1974) was an Italian sports shooter. He competed in the 50 m pistol event at the 1936 Summer Olympics.

References

External links
 

1883 births
1974 deaths
Italian male sport shooters
Olympic shooters of Italy
Shooters at the 1936 Summer Olympics
Sportspeople from Pisa
20th-century Italian people